Euodynerus is a genus of potter wasps with a mainly Holarctic distribution, though a number of species extend through Indomalayan, Australasian, Afrotropical and northern Neotropical regions. Also, a single species is reported from Hawaii.

Species
Species within this genus include:

 Euodynerus adiacens
 Euodynerus afghanicus
 Euodynerus alaris
 Euodynerus albomaculatus
 Euodynerus alvarado
 Euodynerus angulatus
 Euodynerus annae
 Euodynerus annectens
 Euodynerus annulatus
 Euodynerus apicalis
 Euodynerus aspra
 Euodynerus auranus
 Euodynerus barberi
 Euodynerus bicingulatus
 Euodynerus bidens
 Euodynerus bidentatus
 Euodynerus bidentiformis
 Euodynerus bidentoides
 Euodynerus boscii
 Euodynerus breviventris
 Euodynerus caspicus
 Euodynerus castigatus
 Euodynerus catepetlensis
 Euodynerus cherkensis
 Euodynerus clatratus
 Euodynerus cluniculus
 Euodynerus convergens
 Euodynerus cordovae
 Euodynerus coriaceus
 Euodynerus crypticus
 Euodynerus curictensis
 Euodynerus cylindriventris
 Euodynerus dantici
 Euodynerus delicatus
 Euodynerus digiticornis
 Euodynerus discogaster
 Euodynerus disconotatus
 Euodynerus distinctus
 Euodynerus diversus
 Euodynerus effrenatus
 Euodynerus egregius
 Euodynerus enodatus
 Euodynerus espagnoli
 Euodynerus excellens
 Euodynerus exceptus
 Euodynerus exoglyphus
 Euodynerus fabulosus
 Euodynerus familiaris
 Euodynerus fastidiosus
 Euodynerus foraminatus
 Euodynerus formosus
 Euodynerus fouadi
 Euodynerus gaullei
 Euodynerus geometricus
 Euodynerus guerrero
 Euodynerus haitiensis
 Euodynerus hellenicus
 Euodynerus hidalgo
 Euodynerus hottentotus
 Euodynerus khuzestanicus
 Euodynerus kilimandjaroensis
 Euodynerus koenigsmanni
 Euodynerus leucomelas
 Euodynerus localis
 Euodynerus longisetulosus
 Euodynerus macedonicus
 Euodynerus macswaini
 Euodynerus masariformis
 Euodynerus mavromoustakisi
 Euodynerus maximilianus
 Euodynerus megaera
 Euodynerus nahariensis
 Euodynerus nigripennis
 Euodynerus niloticus
 Euodynerus nipanicus
 Euodynerus notatus
 Euodynerus oslarensis
 Euodynerus pallidus
 Euodynerus planitarsis
 Euodynerus posticus
 Euodynerus pratensis
 Euodynerus provisoreus
 Euodynerus pseudocaspicus
 Euodynerus pseudocoriaceus
 Euodynerus pseudonotata
 Euodynerus quadrifaciatus
 Euodynerus quadrifasaciatus
 Euodynerus quadrifasciatus
 Euodynerus reflexus
 Euodynerus rhynchoides
 Euodynerus rufinus
 Euodynerus salzi
 Euodynerus schwarzi
 Euodynerus scudderi
 Euodynerus segregatus
 Euodynerus semiaethiopicus
 Euodynerus semidantici
 Euodynerus semisaecularis
 Euodynerus setosus
 Euodynerus seulii
 Euodynerus shirazensis
 Euodynerus siegberti
 Euodynerus socotrae
 Euodynerus soikai
 Euodynerus stigma
 Euodynerus strigatus
 Euodynerus subannulatus
 Euodynerus succinctus
 Euodynerus sulphuripes
 Euodynerus tempiferus
 Euodynerus tisiphone
 Euodynerus trilobus
 Euodynerus trituberculatus
 Euodynerus unifasciatus
 Euodynerus variegatus
 Euodynerus velutinus
 Euodynerus verticalis

Gallery

References

 Carpenter, J.M., J. Gusenleitner & M. Madl. 2010a. A Catalogue of the Eumeninae (Hymenoptera: Vespidae) of the Ethiopian Region excluding Malagasy Subregion. Part II: Genera Delta de Saussure 1885 to Zethus Fabricius 1804 and species incertae sedis. Linzer Biologischer Beitrage 42 (1): 95-315.

Biological pest control wasps
Potter wasps
Taxa named by Karl Wilhelm von Dalla Torre